Lesotho competed in the 2006 Commonwealth Games in Melbourne, Australia from 15 March – 26 March 2006.

Medals

Silver
Moses Kopo, Boxing at the 2006 Commonwealth Games, Light Welterweight 64 kg.

2006 in Lesotho sport
Lesotho at the Commonwealth Games
Nations at the 2006 Commonwealth Games